Georg-Brauchle-Ring is an U-Bahn station in Munich on the U1. It is located below the Georg-Brauchle-Ring, part of Munich's Mittlerer Ring ring road system. It opened on 18 October 2003. Artist Franz Ackermann produced two coloured walls for the station entitled The Great Journey and consisting of 400 panels, each wall weighing 30 tons.

References

External links

Munich U-Bahn stations
Railway stations in Germany opened in 2003